The 2013–14 EuroChallenge was the 11th edition of Europe's third-tier level transnational competition for men's professional basketball clubs. The winner and the runner-up of this competition earned a place at the group stage of the 2014–15 Eurocup season.

The Final Four was held in PalaDozza in Bologna, Italy. The host of the tournament, Grissin Bon Reggio Emilia won the Final by beating Triumph Lyubertsy 79–65. Italian player Andrea Cinciarini received the Final Four MVP award.

Competition format changes
This year's EuroChallenge saw a number of innovations, including the division of the participating clubs into two main Conferences for the Regular Season  - Conference 1 and Conference 2 - based on a broad geographical criteria. This year no qualification round was held.
The 32 teams were divided into eight round-robin groups of four teams each for the regular season. The two best-placed teams qualified to the next phase of the competition.

Teams
The labels in the parentheses show how each team qualified for the place of its starting round. (TH: Title holder)
 1st, 2nd, 3rd, 4th, 5th, etc.: League position after eventual playoffs

Draw
The draws for the 2013–14 FIBA EuroChallenge were held on Friday, July 5 in Munich, Germany.
Teams were seeded into four pots of four teams in accordance with the FIBA Club ranking, based on their performance in European competitions during a three-year period.

The 32 clubs registered for this year's competition were divided into two conferences (1 and 2), based on broad geographical criteria.

Conference 1

Conference 2

Regular season
The regular season began on November 5.

If teams are level on record at the end of the Regular Season, tiebreakers are applied in the following order:
 Head-to-head record.
 Head-to-head point differential.
 Point differential during the Regular Season.
 Points scored during the regular season.
 Sum of quotients of points scored and points allowed in each Regular Season match.

Group A

Group B

Group C

Group D

Group E

Group F

Group G

Group H

Last 16

Group I

Group J

|}

Group K

|}

Group L

|}

Quarterfinals

The quarter-finals were played in a best-of-three series. The dates of the matches were 11, 13 and 18 March. Team 1 played the first and the third game at home court.

Final Four

The Final Four was played between the four winners of the quarterfinals at PalaDozza in Bologna, Italy. It was the second time the EuroChallenge Final Four was held in Bologna.

Individual statistics

Points

Rebounds

Assists

Individual highs

Awards

Weekly MVP
Regular season

Last 16

Quarterfinals

Final Four MVP
 Andrea Cinciarini (Grissin Bon Reggio Emilia)

See also
 2013–14 Euroleague
 2013–14 Eurocup

References

 
FIBA EuroChallenge seasons
EuroChallenge